The Golden Globe Award for Best Actor – Television Series Musical or Comedy is a Golden Globe Award presented annually by the Hollywood Foreign Press Association (HFPA). It is given in honor of an actor who has delivered an outstanding performance in a leading role on a musical or comedy television series for the calendar year.

It was first awarded at the 19th Golden Globe Awards on March 5, 1962, under the title Best TV Star – Male to John Charles Daly and Bob Newhart. The nominees for the award announced annually starting in 1963. The award initially honored actors in both comedy and drama genres until 1969, when the award was split into categories that honored comedic and dramatic performances separately. It was presented under the new title Best TV Actor – Musical or Comedy and in 1980 under its current title.

Since its inception, the award has been given to 45 actors. Alan Alda has won the most awards in this category with six wins and received the most nominations at 11.

Winners and nominees
Listed below are the winners of the award for each year, as well as the other nominees.

Best TV Star – Male

1960s

1970s

Best Actor – Television Series Musical or Comedy

1980s

1990s

2000s

2010s

2020s

Superlatives

Multiple wins

Multiple nominations

See also
 TCA Award for Individual Achievement in Comedy
 Critics' Choice Television Award for Best Actor in a Comedy Series
 Primetime Emmy Award for Outstanding Lead Actor in a Comedy Series
 Screen Actors Guild Award for Outstanding Performance by a Male Actor in a Comedy Series

References

Actor R Television Series Musical or Comedy
 
Television awards for Best Actor